Herbert Shaw may refer to:

 Herbert H. Shaw (born 1930), perennial New Jersey political candidate
 Herbert John Shaw (1918–2006), professor of electrical engineering
 Herbert Kenneth Airy Shaw (1902–1985), English botanist and classicist